Emigdio "Dino" Palou Tanjuatco III is a Filipino lawyer and politician. A member of the Liberal Party, he currently serves as a member of the Philippine House of Representatives representing the 2nd District of Rizal since 2022.

Education
Tanjuatco attended Ateneo de Manila University, where he completed his elementary (1983), secondary (1987), and tertiary educations, wherein he completed a Bachelor of Arts major in Interdisciplinary Studies in 1991 and a Juris Doctor degree in 1995. He passed the bar exams in 1996.

Career 
Tanjuatco served as a member of the Rizal Provincial Board representing the province's 2nd district for three terms from 2013 to 2022.

In 2014, Tanjuatco was appointed President and CEO of the Clark International Airport Corporation by then-President Benigno Aquino III. He served from October 3, 2014 to August 19, 2016.

In the 2022 Philippine general election, Tanjuatco successfully contested the seat of Rizal's 2nd congressional district, which was recently redistricted due to the establishment of the 3rd and 4th districts.

References 

Living people
Members of the House of Representatives of the Philippines from Rizal
Liberal Party (Philippines) politicians
Ateneo de Manila University alumni
People from Rizal
Year of birth missing (living people)